What Josiah Saw is a 2021 American Southern Gothic psychological horror drama film directed by Vincent Grashaw. The film follows members of a damaged family before they reunite at their remote farmhouse, where they will confront long-buried secrets and sins of the past.

Cast
Robert Patrick as Josiah Graham
Nick Stahl as Eli Graham
Scott Haze as Thomas Graham
Kelli Garner as Mary Milner
Jake Weber as Boone
Tony Hale as Ross Milner
Ronnie Gene Blevins as Billy
Dana Namerode as Gypsy Gina
Riley Kahn as Little Girl

Production
In December 2019, it was announced that filming wrapped in Oklahoma.

Release
The film made its world premiere at the Fantasia International Film Festival on August 13, 2021.

Reception

Brian Tallerico of RogerEbert.com gave the film a positive review and wrote that the film "is unapologetically brutal, the kind of haunting drama that feels unsettling and dangerous even in its quiet, character-driven moments." Andrew Mack of Screen Anarchy also gave the film a positive review and wrote, "Robert Patrick is an absolute force to be reckoned with." Michelle Swope of Dread Central awarded the film four and a half stars out of five and wrote, "Masterful storytelling, spectacular performances, and an overwhelming atmosphere of dread make What Josiah Saw brilliantly agonizing psychological horror." Bobby LePire of Film Threat gave the film a 10 out of 10 and wrote that it "examines religion, trauma, grief, sanity, and familial bonds in a truly unique way."

Katie Rife of The A.V. Club gave the film a negative review and wrote that "the writer-director piles deviancy on top of taboo until your trauma receptors go numb."

References

External links
 
 

2020s English-language films
Films set on farms